Swarnavahini  (literally Golden Channel) is a Sinhala language general entertainment and news television channel in Sri Lanka owned by EAP Broadcasting Company, a subsidiary of EAP Holdings. Launched in 1994 as ETV (Extra Terrestrial Vision), it was one of Sri Lanka's first privately owned television channels. Its sister channel ETV 2 was launched in 1995 when ETV was re-branded ETV 1. The channel's owner Extra Terrestrial Vision (Private) Limited, who had been incorporated on 6 July 1992, changed its name to EAP Network (Private) Limited on 30 April 1996 following the acquisition by EAP. At that time ETV 1 was re-broadcasting BBC. ETV 1 was re-launched as Swarnavahini, a mass market Sinhala language channel, on 16 March 1997. EAP Network (Private) Limited changed its name to EAP Broadcasting Company (Private) Limited on 16 May 2012, EAP Network (Private) Limited on 31 October 2012, EAP Network Limited on 28 August 2013 and EAP Broadcasting Company Limited on 11 September 2013.

It is available via satellite on Dialog TV (channel 7) and Dish TV (channel 2516). It is also available on Lanka Broadband Networks cable TV and PEO TV IPTV (channel 6).

The popular news reading program Mul Pituwa presented by journalist Bandula Padmakumara successfully aired its 1000th program on 30 March 2006.

Teledramas

Casting Teledramas

 Kolam Kuttama
 Bandana
 Dekada kada
 Nadagamkarayo
 Paara Dige
 Once up on a time in COLOMBO 
 Massa
 KEY
 Nonimi

Finished Teledramas 

Aganthukaya
Agni Piyapath
Amaliya
Amuthu Rasikaya
Anantha 
Anguru Siththam
Appachchi
"As"
Boheemiyanuwa
Bus Eke Iskoole
Click
Chalo
Dadayam Bambaru
Dangale (re-run)
Dangamalla
Dara Garage
Daskon
Eka Iththaka Mal
Golu Thaththa
Haara Kotiya 
Hadawathe Kathawa
Hansa Pihatu
Hoda Wade
Ingi Bingi
Kalu Araliya
Kota Uda Mandira
Kotipathiyo
Kumi
Meedum Amma
Monara Kadadasi
Monarathenna
Naana Kamare
Night Learners
Nadagamkarayo
Olu (re-run)
Package
Pooja
Pithru
Queen
Raja Sabhawa
Ran Bedi Minissu
Saki 
Sakuge Kathawa 
Sanda Pini Wessa
See Raja
Sepalika
Sihina Samagama
Sikka
Sillara Samanallu
Snap
Teacher Amma
Thara
Thattu Gewal
Thawa Durai Jeewithe
Wes & Wes Next Chapter  
Walawettuwa
Yakada Kahawanu

Dubbed Teledramas
Aladdin - Naam Toh Suna Hoga as Aladdin
Paramavatar Shri Krishna as Maharaja Kansa
Chandra Nandini as Chandra Nandani
Tamanna as Dhara
Saath Nibhaana Saathiya as Mage Sanda Obai
Mahabharat as Mahabharat
Shaka Laka Boom Boom as Maya Pensala
My Girl as Samanali
Do Dil Bandhe Ek Dori Se as Shivani

Cartoons 

 Silvan - සිල්වාන්
 Gladiator Academy - සෙන්පති අඩවිය
 Prudence Investigations - රෝසි ආච්චි 
 Franklin - ෆ්‍රැන්ක්ලින් 
 Ghostbusters
 Heman
 Moby Dick - මොබි ඩික් 
 Puss in Boots
 සූත්තර කිටී
 All Hail King Julien - පුතානෝ සහ කොටානෝ

English Kids Movies (Sinhala Dubbed) 

 Kids Toons
Movie Toons
Hachiko
 Frozen
Upcoming Shows 

 Wonderland Vanchavak

References

External links
 
 Family Doctor to cure tele diseases
 Dance Stars Dance on Swarnavahini

1994 establishments in Sri Lanka
EAP Networks
Sinhala-language television stations
Television channels and stations established in 1994